Martial Lavaud Célestin (October 4, 1913 – February 4, 2011) was named Prime Minister of Haïti by President Leslie Manigat in February 1988 under the provisions of the 1987 Constitution, and was approved by the Parliament that formed as a result of the January 17, 1988 elections. He was deposed by the coup that took place on June 20 (June 1988 Haitian coup d'état). He was born in Ganthier and was a lawyer by profession. Célestin died on February 4, 2011, at the age of 97.

References

1913 births
2011 deaths
Prime Ministers of Haiti